Hai Yung was a protected cruiser of the Chinese Navy. Hai Yung was one of a class of three ships built in Germany for the Chinese after the losses of the First Sino-Japanese War. The ship was a small protected cruiser with quick-firing guns, a departure from the prewar Chinese navy's emphasis on heavy but slow-firing weapons for its cruisers.

In 1906 Hai Yung was sent on a six-month journey to survey the conditions of overseas Chinese communities in South-East Asia. Much of the navy switched loyalties to the rebellion that overthrew the Manchu dynasty in 1911.. On 24 April 1916, Hai Yung collided with the Chinese Army transport ship   in the East China Sea south of the Chusan Islands. Hsin-Yu sank with the loss of about 1,000 lives.

Hai Yung and her sister ships survived the revolution and were obsolete by 1935, when they were discarded. They all were scuttled as blockships in the Yangtze on 11 August 1937 during the Second Sino-Japanese War.

References

Bibliography

 Wright, R., The Chinese Steam Navy, 1862–1945 (London, 2001)

Ships built in Stettin
Naval ships of China
1897 ships
Cruisers of the Beiyang Fleet
Second Sino-Japanese War cruisers of China
Maritime incidents in 1916
Maritime incidents in 1937
Cruisers of Imperial China